The 2022–23 season is Al-Hazem's 66th year in their existence and their first back season in the FD League. Al-Hazem were relegated to the second tier of Saudi football after finishing 16th in the 2021–22 Saudi Pro League.

The season covered the period from 1 July 2022 to 30 June 2023.

Players

Squad information

Out on loan

Transfers and loans

Transfers in

Loans in

Transfers out

Loans out

Pre-season

Competitions

First Division League

League table

Results summary

Results by round

Matches
All times are local, AST (UTC+3).

Statistics

Appearances
Last updated on 15 February 2022.

|-
! colspan=10 style=background:#dcdcdc; text-align:center|Goalkeepers

|-
! colspan=10 style=background:#dcdcdc; text-align:center|Defenders

|-
! colspan=10 style=background:#dcdcdc; text-align:center|Midfielders

|-
! colspan=10 style=background:#dcdcdc; text-align:center|Forwards

|-
! colspan=14 style=background:#dcdcdc; text-align:center| Players sent out on loan this season

|-
! colspan=18 style=background:#dcdcdc; text-align:center| Player who made an appearance this season but have left the club

|}

Goalscorers

Last Updated: 15 February 2022

Assists

Last Updated: 15 February 2022

Clean sheets

Last Updated: 15 February 2022

References

Al-Hazem F.C. seasons
Hazem